Yoruba country was a West African ethno-region located within the continent of Africa which was first introduced to the Western world in text in the 19th century through the writings of visitors who documented their voyages through West Africa, particularly through those who visited the region geographically bounded by the Volta river to its west and bounded by the Benin river on its eastern edge and inhabited by the Yoruba people. The date of its founding is uncertain but by the 19th century to early 20th century, visitors from England were able to give accounts of its geographical and cultural traits and classification in published works, including the Encyclopædia Britannica.

Geography 
The area is bordered by the Niger River to its east, the same river (once called the Quorra) to its north, the kingdom of Dahomey to its southwest, and the Bight of Benin to its south from which it spread to within 40 miles of the Niger. The area at the end of the 19th century bordered Bariba Country to the north, French Porto-Novo to the west.

Descriptions 
British explorer Alvan Milson under the Royal Geographical Society writes of the people within the region that they are self-sufficient people not requiring trade with the West and instead gain their resources from the north and east of their region, also engaging in trade from the Sahara. The Yoruba of the region are said to be a "peace-loving race, fairly industrious and who prefer working on farms and attending markets more than war". Modern facilities have reached the area, with regular weekly mail service by steam-launch between Lagos and Porto-Novo.

See also
Yorubaland ethnic area

References

Further reading

 Barber, Mary Ann Serrett (1857) Oshielle, Or, Village Life in the Yoruba Country. J. Nisbet and Company.
 Hinderer, Anna. Hone, Richard Brindley (1873). Seventeen Years in the Yoruba Country. Seeley, Jackson, and Halliday.

External links

Travel routes once established in the Yoruba country – Map on the route through Yoruba country in 1895 (digital.library.illinois.edu)

Yoruba history
Countries in precolonial Africa
Former countries in Africa
Former territorial entities in Africa
Former countries
Former territorial entities